Piccolo is a 1959 Yugoslavian film.

Plot
Two men live in neighboring apartments.  They are good friends and help each other out however possible.  However, when one of them starts playing his piccolo to accompany the song of a nearby bird, the other gets angry.  They proceed to play louder instruments than the other, even hiring extra people to assist.

Credits
A Production of: Zagreb Film Cartoon Studio, Yugoslavia
Color by: Eastmancolor
Scenario: Dušan Vukotić
Backgrounds: Zvonimir Lončarić
Music: Branimir Sakač
Book Recording: Dušan Vukotić, Boris Kolar
Key Animator: Vladimir Hrs
Animation: Stanko Garber, Rudolf Mudrovčić
Assistant Director: Slavko Marjanac
Music Supervisor: Tea Brunšmid
Sound: Mladen Prebil
Cinematography: Ivan Goričanec, Miroslav Margetić
Titles: Josip Pilat
Other realizers: Members of the Cartoon Studio
Chief Cartoonist and Director: Dusan Vukotic

External links
 

1959 films
Zagreb Film films
Yugoslav animated short films
Croatian animated short films